This is a list of development aid agencies which provide regional and international development aid or assistance, divided between national (mainly OECD countries) and international organizations.  Agencies of numerous development cooperation partners from emerging countries such as India, Middle Eastern countries, Mexico, South Africa, Thailand, Singapore, and so on, are not included.

International
Argentina - White Helmets Commission (Comisión Cascos Blancos)
Australia - Department of Foreign Affairs and Trade (Development Cooperation Division), formerly AusAID
Austria - Austrian Development Agency - ADA The Austrian Development Cooperation, Austria Wirtschaftsservice Gesellschaft (aws)
Azerbaijan - Azerbaijan International Development Agency
Belgium - Ministry of Foreign Affairs, Foreign Trade and Development: Belgian Policy Plan for Development Cooperation 
Brazil - Agência Brasileira de Cooperação
Canada - Canadian International Development Agency (absorbed into Foreign Affairs, Trade, and Development Canada, now known as Global Affairs Canada), the International Development Research Centre (IDRC) and the Canadian Executive Services Organization (CESO|SACO)
 Chile - Agencia de Cooperación Internacional de Chile (AGCI)
 China - China International Development Cooperation Agency (CIDCA)
 formerly, Department of Foreign Aid of the Ministry of Commerce (MOFCOM) 
 Czech Republic - Czech Development Agency (CzDA)
 Denmark - Danish International Development Agency (DANIDA)
 Egypt - Egyptian Agency for Partnership for Development
 European Union - Directorate-General for International Partnerships
Finland - Department for International Development Cooperation (FINNIDA)
France - Expertise France, Department for International Cooperation and French Development Agency (AFD)
Germany - Federal Ministry for Economic Cooperation and Development, Kreditanstalt für Wiederaufbau (KfW), and Deutsche Gesellschaft für Internationale Zusammenarbeit (GIZ)
Greece - Ministry of Foreign Affairs
India- Indian Agency for Partnership in Development (IAPD) , Development Partnership Administration, Indian Technical and Economical Cooperation (Since 1964)ITEC :Indian Technical and Economic Cooperation
Iran - Organization for Investment, Economic, and Technical Assistance of Iran
Ireland - Irish Aid
Israel - Ministry of Foreign Affairs: MASHAV - Israel's Agency for International Development Cooperation
Italy - Ministry of Foreign Affairs: Italian Development Cooperation Programme
Japan - Japan International Cooperation Agency (JICA), and Japan Bank for International Cooperation (JBIC)
Korea - Korea International Cooperation Agency (KOICA)
Kuwait - Kuwait Fund for Arab Economic Development
Liechtenstein - Liechtensteinische Entwicklungsdienst
Luxembourg - Lux-Development
Mexico - AMEXCID
New Zealand - Ministry of Foreign affairs and Trade (MFAT) previously known as New Zealand Agency for International Development (NZAid)
Netherlands - Ministry of Development Cooperation (has its own minister but is a part of the Ministry of Foreign Affairs) and The Netherlands Foreign Trade and Development Agency(NFTDA)
Norway - Ministry of Foreign Affairs: International Development Program and Norwegian Agency for Development Cooperation (NORAD)
Poland - Ministry of Foreign Affairs: The Development Co-operation Department
Portugal - Camões - Instituto da Cooperação e da Língua
Pakistan - Pakistan Technical Assistance Programme
Palestine - Palestinian International Cooperation Agency (PICA)
Republic of China (Taiwan) - International Cooperation and Development Fund(ICDF)
Romania - Assistance for Development (AOD)
Russia - Federal Agency for the Commonwealth of Independent States, Compatriots Living Abroad and International Humanitarian Cooperation (Rossotrudnichestvo)
Saudi Arabia - Saudi Fund for Development (SFD)
Slovakia - Slovak Aid
Spain - Spanish Agency for International Development Cooperation (AECID)
South Africa - Development Bank of Southern Africa (DBSA)
Sweden - Swedish International Development Cooperation Agency (Sida)
Switzerland - Swiss Agency for Development and Cooperation (SDC), Helvetas
Taiwan - International Cooperation and Development Fund (Taiwan ICDF)
Thailand - Thailand International Cooperation Agency (TICA)
Turkey - Turkish Cooperation and Coordination Agency (TİKA)
United Kingdom - Foreign, Commonwealth and Development Office (FCDO)
United States - United States Agency for International Development (USAID), the Inter-American Foundation (IAF), Millennium Challenge Corporation (MCC), and the African Development Foundation (ADF)

Multilateral Organizations 
African Development Bank (AfDB)
Asian Development Bank (ADB)
Asian Infrastructure Investment Bank (AIIB)
Black Sea Trade and Development Bank
Caribbean Development Bank (CDB)
Colombo Plan (CP)
Development Bank of Latin America (CAF)
Eurasian Development Bank
European Bank for Reconstruction and Development (EBRD)
European Investment Bank
Food and Agriculture Organization of the United Nations (FAO)
Inter-American Development Bank (IADB)
International Bank for Reconstruction and Development (IBRD; part of the World Bank Group)
International Development Law Organization (IDLO)
International Fund for Agricultural Development (IFAD)
International Labour Organization (ILO)
International Monetary Fund (IMF)
International Organization for Migration (IOM)
International Red Cross (ICRC AND IFRC)
Islamic Development Bank (IDB)
Multilateral Investment Guarantee Agency (MIGA, part of the World Bank Group)
Organisation for Economic Co-operation and Development (OECD)
Technical Centre for Agricultural and Rural Cooperation ACP-EU (CTA)
United Nations (UN)
United Nations Children's Fund (UNICEF)
United Nations Conference on Trade and Development (UNCTAD)
United Nations Development Programme (UNDP)
United Nations Population Fund (UNFPA)
United Nations Environment Programme (UNEP)
United Nations High Commissioner for Refugees (UNHCR)
United Nations Industrial Development Organization (UNIDO)
United Nations Office for the Coordination of Humanitarian Affairs (OCHA)
World Bank Group
World Food Programme (WFP)
World Health Organization (WHO)
World Trade Organization (WTO)

Non-governmental organisations 
ACTED
ActionAid
Adventist Development and Relief Agency
Afghan German Management College
AID Kenya Foundation
AIDS No More
AKDN
All We Can - Methodist relief and development
BRAC
Business Council for Peace
Camfed
CARE (relief agency), originally "Cooperative for American Remittances to Europe", and later "Cooperative for Assistance and Relief Everywhere"
Catholic Relief Services
Centre for Safety and Development
Center for Victims of Torture
Centre for Values in Leadership
Christian Aid
Agency of International Cooperation for Development
Compassion International
Dubai Cares
European Sustainable Development Organisation (ESDO)
Five Talents
Giving Children Hope
Habitat for Humanity International
Heifer International
Helpage International
HOPE International Development Agency
ICLEI - Local Governments for Sustainability
International Development Enterprises
International Medical Relief
International Women's Development Agency
International Youth Foundation
Jugend Eine Welt
Lamia Afghan Foundation
Light for the World
Malteser International
Medecins sans Frontieres
Medical Teams International
Mennonite Central Committee
Mercy Corps
Mercy Relief
Oxfam
Peace Direct
Plan International
Rapid Response
Samaritan's Purse
Save the Children
Seva Foundation
SNV Netherlands Development Organisation
Street Kids International
Sustainable Sanitation Alliance
Swissaid
Teach For All
TMSS
Tearfund
Terra Tech
Trickle Up
United Purpose
WaterAid
Women in Europe for a Common Future (WECF)
World Accord - International Development Agency
World Renew
World Vision International

Web portals 
 Global South Development Magazine: magazine dedicated to international development 
 Development Business
 DevelopmentAid
 Devex: jobs, news and business advice
 ReliefWeb

See also

 :Category:Development charities

References

International development multilaterals
Development